Luo Qi (born October 1967) is a Chinese engineer, nuclear physicist, academician of the Chinese Academy of Engineering (CAE), and currently president of Nuclear Power Institute of China (NPIC). He is a member of the China Nuclear Energy Association (CNEA).

Biography
Luo was born in Fushun County, Sichuan, in October 1967. He attended Fushun No.2 High School. He matriculated at Xi'an Jiaotong University in 1984, where he earned a master's degree in thermodynamics. He is a senior engineer, doctoral supervisor and the current president of Nuclear Power Institute of China (NPIC). 

He was a member of the 12th National Committee of the Chinese People's Political Consultative Conference and is a member of the 13th National Committee of the Chinese People's Political Consultative Conference.

Honours and awards
 November 22, 2019 Member of the Chinese Academy of Engineering (CAE)

References

1967 births
Living people
People from Fushun County, Sichuan
Engineers from Sichuan
Xi'an Jiaotong University alumni
Chinese nuclear physicists
Members of the Chinese Academy of Engineering